The  is the regular edition of the annual Japanese national cup tournament. It started on 31 August 2013 and ended on 1 January 2014 with the final at National Stadium in Tokyo.

Yokohama F. Marinos defeated 2013 J.League Division 1 champions Sanfrecce Hiroshima 2–0 for their seventh Emperor's Cup, their first in twenty-one years and their second in the J.League era after winning 1992 Emperor's Cup as Nissan F.C. Yokohama Marinos. The cup winners would normally receive a berth in the upcoming AFC Champions League; as F. Marinos finished as J.League runners-up that year, the nod went to Cerezo Osaka, the fourth-placed team in the 2013 J.League Division 1.

Calendar

Participating clubs
88 clubs compete in the tournament. The 18 J.League Division 1 clubs and 22 J.League Division 2 clubs receive a bye to the second round of the tournament. The other 47 teams earned berths by winning their respective prefectural cup tournaments, and will enter from the first round along with the JFL seeded team, the team with the best record after the 17th matchday.

First round
The 47 prefectural tournament winners join JFL seeded team Kamatamare Sanuki in the first round.

Second round
The 24 winners from the first round are joined by all 40 J.League teams. Ties that were played on September 11 had been moved from their originally-scheduled dates of September 7 and 8; the Kashiwa Reysol–University of Tsukuba match originally scheduled for the 7th was moved to the 10th, then the 4th due to a league scheduling conflict.

Third round
A.C. Nagano Parceiro and Zweigen Kanazawa, both playing in the Japan Football League, were the lowest-ranked teams remaining at this stage in the competition.

Fourth round
The draw for the remaining rounds of the tournament was held on October 20. Only three teams outside the top flight remain: Consadole Sapporo and Montedio Yamagata of J.League Division 2 and A.C. Nagano Parceiro of the Japan Football League.

Matches between J1 sides were played on November 16; matches involving J2 or JFL clubs were played on November 20 to avoid scheduling conflicts.

Quarterfinals
The four quarter-final matches, all featuring J.League Division 1 clubs, will be played on December 22.

Semifinals

Final

External links
 Japan Football Association page on the Emperor's Cup (Japanese)

Emperor's Cup
Emperor's Cup
Cup
Cup